The 1998 Dubai Tennis Championships was a men's tennis tournaments played on outdoor hard courts at the Aviation Club Tennis Centre in Dubai in the United Arab Emirates that were part of the World Series of the 1998 ATP Tour. The tournament was held from 9 February through 15 February 1998. Fourth-seeded Àlex Corretja won the singles title.

Finals

Singles

 Àlex Corretja defeated  Félix Mantilla 7–6(7–0), 6–1
 It was Corretja's 1st title of the year and the 5th of his career.

Doubles

 Mahesh Bhupathi /  Leander Paes defeated  Donald Johnson /  Francisco Montana 6–2, 7–5
 It was Bhupathi's 2nd title of the year and the 8th of his career. It was Paes' 2nd title of the year and the 8th of his career.

References

External links
 Official website
 ATP tournament profile
 ITF tournament edition details

 
Dubai Tennis Championships
Dubai Tennis Championships